is a Japanese manga artist. He is best known for being author and illustrator of the manga Beelzebub which was first published as a one shot in Weekly Shōnen Jump, 2008. It was then serialised in 2009. Tamura was formerly assistant/student to Toshiaki Iwashiro, the author of Psyren, also serialized in Weekly Shōnen Jump.

Works

One-shots
Ura Beat (2003, Weekly Shōnen Jump)
Tiger Dragon Brother (2015, Weekly Shōnen Jump)
Rappa Rendan (2019, Weekly Shōnen Jump)

Series
 Beelzebub (2009-2014, Weekly Shōnen Jump)
 Beelzebub Bangai Hen (2015, Weekly Shōnen Jump) 
 Hungry Marie (2017, Weekly Shōnen Jump, U.S. edition of Weekly Shonen Jump, via Jump Start)  
 Hard-Boiled Cop and Dolphin (2020–2021, Weekly Shōnen Jump, Viz Media Shonen Jump)
 Pyramid no Himitsu (2023–present, Bentame Jump)
 Cosmos (2023–present, Monthly Sunday Gene-X)

References

External links 

1980 births
Manga artists from Gifu Prefecture
Living people